Dormentes is a city in the Brazilian state of Pernambuco, 750 km away from the state's capital, Recife. The population in 2020, according with IBGE was 19,079 inhabitants and the area is 1539.05 km².

Geography

 State - Pernambuco
 Region - São Francisco Pernambucano
 Boundaries - Santa Filomena  (N);  Petrolina   (S);  Santa Cruz and Lagoa Grande  (E);  Afrânio and Piaui state   (W).
 Area - 1537.59 km²
 Elevation - 492 m
 Hydrography - Garças and Pontal rivers
 Vegetation - Caatinga
 Climate - Semi arid ( Sertão)
 Annual average temperature - 25.1 c
 Distance to Recife - 750 km

Economy

The main economic activities in Dormentes are based in general commerce  and agribusiness, especially creation of sheep (over 82,000 heads), goats (over 35,000), pigs, cattle, donkeys and mules;  and plantations of beans, corn and sorgo.

Economic Indicators

Economy by Sector
2006

Health Indicators

References

Municipalities in Pernambuco